Tho may refer to:

 Jeff Tho (born 1988), badminton player from Australia
 Lê Đức Thọ (1911–1990), a Vietnamese revolutionary, general, diplomat, and politician
 Tho language (disambiguation), various languages
 Thổ people, ethnic group in Northern Vietnam
 Tricolour (political movement) (Czech: Trikolóra hnutí občanů), Czech Republic
 T'ho, Mayan settlement
 The IATA airport code for Þórshöfn Airport near Þórshöfn, Iceland